George Gewinner (May 27, 1814 - January 18, 1894) was a musician and band leader during the American Civil War.  Gewinner was born, raised and educated in Bayreuth, Bavaria, emigrating to the United States in 1848 where he volunteered with the Union Army three different times during the Civil War, serving as chief musician and band leader for the 99th NY Infantry, the 4th Massachusetts Cavalry and the 6th Infantry Regiment.  It was Gewinner's 4th Massachusetts Cavalry band that played the surrender of General Robert E. Lee to General Ulysses S. Grant at Appomattox Courthouse on April 9, 1865, ending the Civil War.

Life 

Georg Gewinner was born May 27, 1814, in Bayreuth, Bavaria to Johann Heinrich Gewinner (1775-1845) and Anna Margaretha née Schrödel (1778-1833).  After completing his basic education in Bayreuth, George set out in 1832 for Munich and completed an eight-year degree program in music.  In 1847, George married Victoria Schneider in Landau-in-der-Pfalz, Germany, after which in 1848 they emigrated to the United States.

George and Victoria had eight children in America, including:
 Amelia Anna Gewinner (1849-1940)
 Oscar Fred Gewinner (1851-1925)
 Otto N. Gewinner (1852-1907)
 Victoria Gewinner (1854-1856)
 Barbara Louisa Gewinner (1857-1932)
 Albert Edward Gewinner (1859-1940)
 Paulina Nannette Gewinner (1861- aft 1940)
 Isabelle Gewinner (1869-1925)

Like most immigrants, George began his new life in America working multiple jobs, in this case as a clock maker like his father, and as a performing musician.  From 1848 to 1858, the Gewinner family lived in New York City, Providence Rhode Island and Boston Massachusetts, where in Boston in the late 1850s, George Gewinner was conductor of the 'New Bedford Brass Band'.  George met Patrick Gilmore in Boston and joined his new Gilmore Band.  Gewinner and Gilmore lived just 6 miles apart, George in Malden Mass and Patrick in Boston. They had both immigrated to the US in 1848, both were active musicians in the Boston area in the late 1850s, and they reportedly became fast friends, a friendship that endured many decades.

Military 
With the onset of the American Civil War in April 1861, George Gewinner was drawn to service.  His close friend Patrick Gilmore was tasked by Governor John Andrew of Massachusetts to re-organize "military music-making" and named 'Bandmaster-general' by General Nathan P. Banks. On 3 Oct 1861, Patrick Gilmore enlisted full-time as Band Leader of the 24th Infantry regiment, and likely due to the strong friendship between the two men, George Gewinner enlisted exactly one week later on 10 Oct 1861 as 'Bandmaster and Chief Musician' with the 99th Infantry regiment.

The 99th, known as the "Union Coast Guard", or "Bartlett's Naval Brigade", was initially organized by Colonel William A. Bartlett in New York City, though it included many men from Massachusetts. George served one year and mustered out of the 99th Infantry in August 1862, volunteering again with the 4th Massachusetts Cavalry, where he served as band leader through 1865.  Campaigns engaged by this unit during Gewinner's time include; Appomattox Campaign, 3rd Battle of Petersburg, Battle of High Bridge, and the Battle of Appomattox Courthouse.  It was reported that Gewinner's band played at the surrender of General Robert E. Lee to General Ulysses S. Grant at the McLean House near Appomattox Courthouse on April 9, 1865.  A few months after the surrender, George mustered out of service again in Boston, Massachusetts Sep 1865.

After the Civil War ended, Gewinner returned to 'private practice', but in March 1870 at the age of 55 he volunteered once more to serve the Army, this time enlisting in the 6th Infantry Regiment along with two of his sons, Oscar and Otto Gewinner.  George was again named 'Bandmaster' and 'Chief Musician'.  During the 1870s the 6th Infantry Regiment was deployed as a protective force to Ft. Buford where they saw action during the Indian Wars in the Dakota and Montana Territories.  When mustering out in August 1873, Gewinner found he had to defend himself again, but this time not from marauding native warriors - the threat came from his own leadership!

Trial 
In August 1873, George was charged with "disobedience to orders in violation of the 9th article of war", and a courts martial was convened at Fort Buford in the Dakota Territory.
According to the original courts martial transcript, George had been ordered by Lt. Col D. Huston Jr to turn his band music over to principal musician Henry Hellmich, but refused to do so on the grounds the music was his own personal property.

Below is the argument George made to assert his personal property rights, in his own words:

"31 July 1873.  I have respectfully to state to the members of the Court that the music I was called upon by Colonel Huston my then commanding officer to give up was my own property composed long before I ever served in the 6th Infantry.  It was my property as much so as the money in my purse.  I was not called upon to loan it but to surrender it.  This music is of my own selection, arrangement and composition, written upon my own paper and arranged in books all my own, and believing that from my then disability I would eventually be discharged, I considered it an aid or means to future support.  Therefore, I especially felt opposed to letting it go from my custody so that it might be, as it certainly would have been, copied.  The Court is therefore, called upon to decide whether I can be protected in my private and personal rights and property as against the assumed authority of my Commanding Officer to deprive me of both; an authority which I then believed and still hold to be unlawful and oppressive.  George Gewinner, Chief Musician, Band of the 6th Infantry"

When the courts martial proceedings were over, George was found 'not guilty' by commanding Brigadier General Alfred Terry for the reason that he could not be ordered to surrender his personal property to the US Government.  Gewinner went on to serve 2 more years, mustering out of military service for the last time in June 1875 for disability.

Death 
After military service, George Gewinner focused on teaching a new generation of music students in Omaha, Nebraska, until his death in the winter of 1894.  He was buried 23 Jan 1894 in Mt. Hope Cemetery, Omaha, NE. [Note: George's grave monument erroneously shows his birth year as 1813, should be 1814.].

References 

1814 births
1894 deaths
19th-century conductors (music)
American bandleaders
Union Army soldiers
People from Bayreuth